Nicida is a genus of air-breathing land snails, terrestrial pulmonate gastropod mollusks in the family Diplommatinidae. These snails are restricted to Western Ghats of India and Sri Lanka.

Three species are recognized.

Species
 Nicida anamallayana (Beddome, 1875)
 Nicida catathymia (Sykes, 1898)
 Nicida ceylanica (Beddome, 1875)
 Nicida delectabilis (Preston, 1905)
 Nicida fairbanki (Blanford, 1868)
 Nicida kingiana (W. T. Blanford & H. F. Blanford, 1861)
 Nicida lankaensis (Preston, 1905)
 Nicida liricincta (Blanford, 1868)
 Nicida nilgirica (W. T. Blanford & H. F. Blanford, 1860)
 Nicida nitidula (Blanford, 1868)
 Nicida pedronis (Beddome, 1875)
 Nicida prestoni (Sykes, 1897)
 Nicida pulneyana (Blanford, 1868)
 Nicida subovata (Beddome, 1875)

References